Jake Sherman is an American singer-songwriter and producer. He has released four solo albums on which he sings and plays all of the instruments.

Sherman began playing piano at the age of four and initially played Scott Joplin rags before becoming heavily influenced in jazz by Jimmy Smith and Herbie Hancock.

As a sideman, he has performed with Bilal, Meshell Ndegeocello, Nick Hakim, Blood Orange, Doobie Powell, Andrew Bird, Benny Sings, Emily King, Gabriel Garzon-Montano, Ralph Peterson Unity Project, Warren Wolf, and David Fiuczynski, among others.

Discography

Solo Recordings 
Jake Sherman (2012)

Jake Sherman Returns (2016)

Jake Sherman Gets Sexy (2020)

You're A Dream (2020)

live ep (2021)

with Jake and Abe 
Selfish Endeavor EP (2019)

(I Won't Be) Home For Christmas (2020)

What's Never Gone [ft. Emily King] (2021)

with JakeTwig 
OK EP (2020)

As Herman Berman 
The Menorah: It's Lit (2019)

Selected Sideman Recordings 

Rosalia HENTAI (piano)

Chance the Rapper No Problem (organ)

Doobie Powell Close To You (songwriting, bass, rhodes, synths, bgv's) OK (vocals, electric piano)

Luke Temple Both-And [album] (synths, clavinet, organ, vibraphone)

Bilal Last Hope (keys, additional production)

Nick Hakim Where Will We Go (Pt. I and II)  (piano, organ) GODS DIRTY WORK (synths, guitar) COMETA (keys on Happen, Vertigo)

L'Rain Suck Teeth (clavinet)

Sam Evian Knock Knock, Sunshine (rhodes)

Ethan Gruska En Garde [album] (vocoder, organ, synth)

Delicate Steve (keys on Looking Glass, Artifical, Still Life, Find My Way)

Gabriel Garzon-Montano Someone (vocoder, wurlitzer)

Devin Morrison MC2U (harmonica)

Joey Dosik Game Winner- stadium version (organ)

Sebastian Mikael Dad, U Ain't Fair, Acid ptii, Rain (keys)  Exit  (rhodes, organ, string synth)

Kemba Alive, Work in Progress (organ)

Goodfight (keys and harmonica on self titled album)

Ryan Lerman Emily (writing, bass, keys, aux production)

Madam C. J. Walker (TV series) Madam (bass, wurlitzer, writing)

Oscar Louis Like Oh (keys, bass, vocoder, production)

ginla Everything (bass, keys, additional production)

Dylan Cox A Place to Meet (piano, organ, mellotron on tracks 1-3, 6, 7)

Bebo Dumont Cronico (organ)

Bernice We Choose You (vocoder)

Jesse and Forever Jesse and Forever [album] and Good Morning! (keys, bass, vocals, harmonica, production) I Was Electrocuted... (piano on "Victoria")

Hannah Cohen Welcome Home (rhodes on Holding On, Get in Line, synth on What's This All About)

Dexter Mason Y-D-K-W and Treefaces (all instruments, production)

Jennah Bell Can't Be too Careful, Everybody Likes to Party, Green and Blue (organ, wurlitzer)

Brasstracks Stay There (organ)

Buz Acres of Diamonds (synths, wurli)

Melanie Charles Detour Ahead (piano)

Alita Moses Still (production, all instruments except guitar and vocals)

Angelica Rahe Tqro (production, instruments) Reina (keys)

Allison Russell 4th Day Prayer (organ)

Anna Wise Vivre d'amour et d'Eau Fraiche (keys)

Vince Anthony Innocence and Jasmine Vanilla (keys, aux production)

Mason Jar Music and Friends Decoration Day Vol I-IV (organ and piano) 5 Doctors movie score (organ) Scenes (piano on Dancing On The Moon)

Sid Sriram Entropy (synth bass) It Isn't True (organ)

Kelsey Waldon Sunday's Children (wurlitzer, organ)

Liz Vice Save Me (vocoder, piano, organ)

DMNEJU Used to Her (vocals, bass, production, songwriting)

Son Of Cloud Son of Cloud (organ)

Space Captain Secret Garden (organ)

Kami Maltz Perfectly the Same (aux production)

Leo Sidran Nobody Kisses Anymore (harmonica)

Ziarra Lover's Lullaby (keys, bgv's)

Flearoy Old Dog, New Tricks (organ)

Sarah Walk Secrets (aux production)

Ajay (keys and additional production on Summer Shade)

Dylan Cox  Animals in the Kitchen (keys)

CARRTOONS Good Run (Juno)

Raven Katz Inside Out (piano)

Scary Pockets Don't Stop Now, Thinking Out Loud  (clavinet, aux production)

Ralph Peterson Jr. ALIVE At Firehouse12 Vol. 1 (organ)

Jamie Woods Can't Let It Go (organ)

Gizmo Red Balloon (organ, rhodes)

Weird Wish Homeowner's Association EP (organ, rhodes, keys)

Josh Garrells Home (organ, keys)

Andreas Arnold Vacio (piano and bass)

Tuck Ryan (organ on Into the Deep)

Emily Elbert Evolve (keys and organ)

Mike Brun There Is No River Strong As Me (keys)

Anatole Muster Outlook (wurli solo)

Alli O'Donnell Trout (organ)

Michael Valeanu Hard To Cook (organ)

David Fiuczynski Flam!  (microtonal keyboards, piano)

Jason Palmer Take a Little Trip (rhodes, piano)

References

External links
Official site

American jazz organists
American male organists
Living people
Musicians from Brooklyn
Jazz musicians from New York (state)
21st-century organists
21st-century American male musicians
American male jazz musicians
Year of birth missing (living people)
21st-century American keyboardists
American male singer-songwriters
Singer-songwriters from New York (state)